Ionis may refer to:

 IONIS Education Group
 IONIS School of Technology and Management
 Ionis Pharmaceuticals